John Barry Boyarski, MB is a Canadian retired  bus driver and recipient of three awards acknowledging bravery.

On August 8, 1985, while working for BC Transit in the Greater Vancouver region, John Boyarski stopped his bus on a Vancouver street to assist a young girl who was being dragged to a car.  Not at first aware that her assailant was armed, he stepped out of the bus, approaching the assailant while the young girl escaped to the inside of the bus. Three gunshots were fired from a semi-automatic pistol, all missing Boyarski. The assailant then fled in his car and was soon captured by police.

The victim had sustained two bullet wounds to the arm prior to Boyarski's arrival.

He was awarded a heroism medal from the Carnegie Hero Fund in October 1986.  On August 19, 1989, he was awarded a Canadian Medal of Bravery by Governor General Jeanne Sauvé.

References

Living people
Bus drivers
People from Greater Vancouver
Recipients of the Carnegie Medal (Carnegie Hero Fund)
Year of birth missing (living people)